A total solar eclipse occurred on October 10, 1912. A solar eclipse occurs when the Moon passes between Earth and the Sun, thereby totally or partly obscuring the image of the Sun for a viewer on Earth. A total solar eclipse occurs when the Moon's apparent diameter is larger than the Sun's, blocking all direct sunlight, turning day into darkness. Totality occurs in a narrow path across Earth's surface, with the partial solar eclipse visible over a surrounding region thousands of kilometres wide. Totality was visible from Ecuador, Colombia, northern tip of Peru and Brazil.

Related eclipses

Solar eclipses 1910–1913

Saros series 142

Notes

References

1912 10 10
1912 in science
1912 10 10
October 1912 events